Johnson is a town in north-central Pottawatomie County, Oklahoma, United States. The population was 247 at the 2010 census, a 10.8 percent increase from the figure of 223 in 2000.

Geography
Johnson is located at  (35.417703, -96.832953).

History
In 1982 residents decided to incorporate to stop Shawnee's plans to establish a landfill near the Johnson community. On May 11, 1982, citizens voted 77 to 40 in favor of incorporation.

Demographics

As of the census of 2000, there were 223 people, 91 households, and 73 families living in the town. There were 105 housing units at an average density of 26.6 per square mile (10.3/km2). The racial makeup of the town was 77.13% White, 1.35% African American, 15.25% Native American, 2.24% Asian, and 4.04% from two or more races. Hispanic or Latino of any race were 1.79% of the population.

There were 91 households, out of which 26.4% had children under the age of 18 living with them, 61.5% were married couples living together, 14.3% had a female householder with no husband present, and 18.7% were non-families. 14.3% of all households were made up of individuals, and 6.6% had someone living alone who was 65 years of age or older. The average household size was 2.45 and the average family size was 2.65.

In the town, the population was spread out, with 23.8% under the age of 18, 6.3% from 18 to 24, 28.3% from 25 to 44, 28.3% from 45 to 64, and 13.5% who were 65 years of age or older. The median age was 41 years. For every 100 females, there were 87.4 males. For every 100 females age 18 and over, there were 88.9 males.

The median income for a household in the town was $29,464, and the median income for a family was $30,893. Males had a median income of $29,844 versus $25,417 for females. The per capita income for the town was $15,305. About 9.9% of families and 9.2% of the population were below the poverty line, including 11.1% of those under the age of eighteen and none of those 65 or over.

References

External links
 Encyclopedia of Oklahoma History and Culture - Johnson

Towns in Oklahoma
Towns in Pottawatomie County, Oklahoma